The 1999 Suwon Samsung Bluewings season was Suwon Samsung Bluewings's fourth season in the K-League in Republic of Korea. Suwon Samsung Bluewings is competing in K-League, League Cup, Korean FA Cup, Super Cup and Asian Club Championship.

Squad

Backroom Staff

Coaching Staff

Honours

Club
K-League Winners
K-League Cup (Adidas Cup) Winners
K-League Cup (Daehan Fire Cup) Winners
Korean Super Cup Winners

Individual
K-League Manager of the Year:  Kim Ho
K-League Top Scorer:  Saša (23 goals)
K-League Cup Top Assistor:  Denis (3 assists)
K-League Best XI:  Lee Woon-Jae,  Shin Hong-Gi,  Seo Jung-Won,  Ko Jong-Soo,  Denis,  Saša

References

External links
 Suwon Bluewings Official website

Suwon Samsung Bluewings seasons
Suwon Samsung Bluewings